The 2022–23 EFL Championship (referred to as the Sky Bet Championship for sponsorship reasons) is the 19th season of the Football League Championship under its current title and the 31st season under its current league division format.

The season started on 29 July 2022 and will end on 6 May 2023. Due to the 2022 FIFA World Cup in Qatar, the Championship took a 4-week break mid-season during the tournament. The break commenced in mid-November and the first round of fixtures after the World Cup was held on 10 December.

Team changes
The following teams have changed division since the 2021–22 season:

To Championship 

 Promoted from League One 
 Wigan Athletic
 Rotherham United
 Sunderland

 Relegated from the Premier League 
 Burnley
 Watford
 Norwich City

From Championship 

 Promoted to the Premier League 
 Fulham
 Bournemouth
 Nottingham Forest

 Relegated to League One 
 Peterborough United
 Derby County
 Barnsley

Stadiums

Personnel and sponsoring

Managerial changes

League table

Results

Season statistics

Top scorers

Hat-tricks

Most assists

Clean sheets

Discipline

Player
 Most yellow cards: 12
 Andy Yiadom 

 Most red cards: 2
 Marvin Ekpiteta 
 Gustavo Hamer 
 Hassane Kamara 
 Gabriel Osho

Club
 Most yellow cards: 90
Swansea City
 Most red cards: 9
Blackpool
 Fewest yellow cards: 58
West Bromwich Albion
 Fewest red cards: 0
Birmingham City
Millwall
Queens Park Rangers
Stoke City

Awards

Monthly

Notes

References

EFL Championship seasons
Eng
1
2
2022–23 EFL Championship
EFL